Alberto Roberto del Rio Chaviano was a Cuban brigadier general who served on the side of, and during Fulgencio Batista's dictatorship of Cuba (1952-1958).   He studied high school at the Instituto de Santa Clara. In November 1933, he entered the Cuban National Army as a soldier. After Batista’s coup on March 10, 1952, he was promoted from captain to colonel. He was the chief colonel of the Moncada Barracks when Fidel Castro and his group attacked the barracks on July 26, 1953. He had an essential role to play in the military during Operation Verano. He played an important role in the defense of the Batista regime during the Cuban Revolution. During the dictatorship of Batista, he was put in charge of the Cuban Army in the region of Oriente in which Raul Castro's guerrilla unit operated, and later in the Las Villas province Batista ordered his arrest and he fled to the Dominican Republic on December 27, 1958. In that country he had a cattle ranch that was expropriated by the Dominican dictator Trujillo, and emigrated to the United States where he was a Spanish teacher. In 1963, he lived in Texas. He died of marrow cancer in the United States in 1978.

References

1915 births
1978 deaths
People from Villa Clara Province
Cuban people of Spanish descent
Cuban military personnel
Cuban anti-communists
People of the Cuban Revolution
Exiles of the Cuban Revolution in the United States